Matt Lambert is an American filmmaker and photographer, primarily known for LGBT related works.

Biography 
Matt Lambert was born and raised in Los Angeles. Most of Lambert photography and cinematic work explores youth and intimacy, especially in queer related social groups.

Cinema 
Matt Lambert works are being screened as part of Tribeca Film Festival.

Filmography

Music Videos

Filmography

Fashion Films 
Lamberts collaborations include Rick Owens, Comme Des Garçons, Gucci, Calvin Klein, Givenchy, Charles Jeffrey, Yves Saint Laurent, Hugo, Diesel, Ludovic de Saint Sernin, Palomo Spain. His work is being published by Dazed, i-D, GQ, Vogue, Documental Journal, Butt.

Publications 
 
 
 
Butt Muscle. 2017. A collaboration with Rick Owens
Pleasure Park. 2019. A collaboration between Tom of Finland Foundation and MEN.com

References

External links 
 
 Matt Lambert in Dazed Magazine 
 Matt Lambert in Vimeo

Living people
American expatriates in Germany
Filmmakers from California
American LGBT photographers
People from Los Angeles
Photographers from California
Year of birth missing (living people)